New Hampshire Route 33 is an  east–west highway in the Seacoast Region of southeastern New Hampshire, connecting Stratham with Portsmouth. The western terminus is at New Hampshire Route 108 in Stratham. The eastern terminus is at U.S. Route 1 (Lafayette Road/Middle Street) in downtown Portsmouth. It is a former routing of New Hampshire Route 101.

The road skirts the south side of Portsmouth International Airport at Pease.

Route description

NH 33 begins at the Stratham Traffic Circle where it meets NH 108. The route travels northeast, passing by Stratham Hill Park and curving to the east before crossing into the town of Greenland. NH 33 meets the northern terminus of NH 151 near the town center, then the highway bends to the northeast and enters the Portsmouth city limits.

NH 33, which is initially Greenland Road upon entering Portmsouth, passes the southern entrance to Pease International Tradeport then interchanges with Interstate 95 at a partial cloverleaf interchange (exit 3) and continues to the east, becoming Middle Road. NH 33 crosses over US 1 Bypass without an intersection before terminating at the intersection of Middle Road and Lafayette Road/Middle Street (US 1). US 1 provides local access to US 1 Bypass to the south.

NH 33 is poorly signed in downtown Portsmouth. NH 33 is unsigned from both Middle Street and Lafayette Road, and no other guide signs are present in the downtown area.

History

The entirety of NH 33 was once the easternmost section of NH 101. In October 1994, NH 101 was re-routed along the former NH 51 from NH 108 in Stratham to Hampton Beach. At that time, what had been NH 101 from the Stratham Traffic Circle to its eastern terminus was designated as NH 33.

Junction list

References

External links

 New Hampshire State Route 33 on Flickr

033
Transportation in Rockingham County, New Hampshire